Roberto Coltri (born 28 June 1969) is an Italian male retired long jumper, who participated at the 1995 World Championships in Athletics.

Biography
He finished 3rd in 1999 European Cup (Super League) and also won two times the national championships at senior level.

Achievements

National titles
Italian Athletics Championships
Long jump: 1999
Italian Indoor Athletics Championships
Long jump: 1995

See also
 Italian all-time lists - Long jump

References

External links
 

1969 births
Italian male long jumpers
World Athletics Championships athletes for Italy
Living people